The Amazing Race 5 (also known as The Amazing Race on Space 3) is the fifth season of the Latin American version of the American reality television show of the same name, The Amazing Race. This season of the show was the third season that aired on the Space channel in association with Disney Media Networks Latin America. It features eleven teams of two, with a pre-existing relationship, in a race across Latin America to win US$250,000 (The second team will win US$20.000). The fifth season returned to the regular format by featuring teams from all over Latin America and not only from Brazil, unlike the previous season.

Colombian television host and model Toya Montoya, who was also a contestant on the third season, replaced the previous host of the regular series Harris Whitbeck, making her the first female host in the franchise. The fifth season premiered on Space and TNT on 16 September 2013 at 9:00 p.m. (UTC−3). The season finale aired on Space and TNT on 9 December 2013 at 9:00 p.m. (UTC−3).

Argentine friends Ezequiel Sapochnik and Tobías de la Barra were the winners of this season.

Production

Development and filming

Space greenlit the fifth season of the series on 19 October 2012. Filming for this fifth season took place from 19 June 2013 to mid-July 2013. The show was broadcast in high-definition television on Space HD.

This seasons' eleven teams were spotted filming in Barranquilla, Colombia on 22 June 2013. Previously visited countries were Colombia, Dominican Republic, Mexico, Panama, and Peru.

None of the eliminated teams were present at the Finish Line.

Marketing
Sponsors for this season were Samsung Electronics and Scotiabank. The sponsors played a major role in the series by providing prizes and integrating their products into various tasks.

Cast
Applications for the fifth season were opened for Brazilians on October 13, 2012. On February 13, 2013 applications were also opened for the rest of Latin America until March 31, 2013.

This season had eleven teams from Argentina, Brazil, Colombia, Costa Rica, Mexico, Venezuela, Uruguay for the first time, and the first contestant from Guatemala. For the first time in the regular series, Chile was not represented. The cast included the series's first brothers-in-law, Filippo & Eddy from Venezuela; Evelyn Christopher from Evelyn & Jorge, who was a contestant on the Colombian Got Talent show, Colombia Tiene Talento, in 2012 with the group Aqualia, Teatro Negro de Colombia; the first binational team in the Latin American version, Juanjo & Beto, representing both Guatemala and Mexico (although The Amazing Race: China Rush have had previously presented binational teams); and the first team from Uruguay, married couple Darío & Esther.

Results
The following teams participated in the season, with their relationships at the time of filming. Note that this table is not necessarily reflective of all content broadcast on television due to inclusion or exclusion of some data. Placements are listed in finishing order:

Key
A  team placement indicates that the team was eliminated.
A  indicates that the team won a Fast Forward clue. If placed next to a leg number, this indicates that the Fast Forward was available for that leg but not used.
A  indicates that the team decided to use the Express Pass on that leg. A  indicates the team had previously been given the second Express Pass and used it on that leg.
An  team placement indicates that the team came in last on a non-elimination leg and had to perform a Speed Bump in the next leg.
A  or a  indicates that the team chose to use one of the two U-Turns in a Double U-Turn;  or  indicates the team who received it;  indicates that the team was U-Turned, but they used the second U-Turn on another team.
Matching colored symbols (and ) indicate teams who worked together during part of the leg as a result of an Intersection.
An underlined leg number indicates that there was no mandatory rest period at the Pit Stop and all teams were ordered to continue racing. The first place team was still awarded a prize for that leg. An underlined team placement indicates that the team came in last, was ordered to continue racing, and had to perform a Speed Bump in the next leg.
Italicized results indicate the position of the team at the midpoint of a two-episode leg.

Notes

Four of the nine teams arrived at the Pit Stop after applied 2-hour penalties for failing to complete the second Roadblock (Esther, Jessica, Beto, and Ezequiel) The initial placements for all teams are as follows (the five boldfaced teams were not given the penalty):
1st: Débora & Renata; 2nd: Darío & Esther; 3rd: Jessica & Michelle; 4th: Beto & Juanjo; 5th: Braian & Karina; 6th: Manfred & Pierre; 7th: Evelyn & Jorge; 8th: Ezequiel & Tobías; 9th: Astrid & Aleja
 Evelyn & Jorge use their Express Pass to bypass the second Roadblock in Leg 3. Before using the Express Pass, Evelyn elected to perform the Roadblock; this is reflected in the total Roadblock count.
 Astrid & Aleja and Débora & Renata initially arrived 6th and 7th, respectively, but both teams were each issued 15-minute penalties for traveling by mototaxi instead of by taxi to the Club Deportivo Caza y Pesca as instructed on the clue. While Astrid & Aleja's placement was dropped to 7th, Débora & Renata's placement Was dropped to last place; however, they were notified the leg was non-elimination, and the remaining penalty would be assessed at the start of the next leg.
 Leg 5 was a double-elimination leg. The last two teams to be checked in at the Pit Stop were both eliminated.
 Evelyn & Jorge initially arrived 2nd, but were issued a 15-minute penalty for not dropping their belongings in the marked area during the additional task in the Club Universitario de Regatas. Ezequiel & Tobias checked-in during the penalty time, dropping Evelyn & Jorge to 3rd.
 Astrid & Aleja used their Express Pass given to them by Evelyn & Jorge to bypass an additional task in the Club Universitario de Regatas during leg 5. Later, they arrived 7th at the Pit Stop, but were issued a 1-hour penalty for failing to complete the Roadblock. This did not affect their placement, since the remaining teams arrived at the time were unable to check in due to penalties accumulated during the leg (see note 7).
 Débora & Renata and Beto & Juanjo initially arrived 6th and 8th, respectively, but both teams were each issued 2-hour penalties for refusing to complete the additional task in the Club Universitario de Regatas. Débora & Renata were further issued their 30-minute penalty for not completing correctly the additional task where they had to make an Amazing Race flag. While Beto & Juanjo's placement was not affected by the penalty, Débora & Renata's placement was dropped to last place; as both teams were the last two teams to check-in at the double-elimination leg (see note 4), both teams were eliminated.
 Ezequiel & Tobías and Karina & Braian initially arrived 1st and 6th, respectively, but both teams were each issued 30-minute penalties for reaching the first Roadblock location before retrieving their clue from the cluebox. While Karina & Braian's placement was not affected by the penalty, Ezequiel & Tobias's placement was dropped to 3rd.
 All the teams (except Darío & Esther) did not realise that they had to light a candle for Saint Michael at the San Miguel Church as indicated on a sign, and were forced to backtrack and light the candle before being allowed to check in.
 Ezequiel & Tobias (who initially arrived 2nd) and Jessica & Michelle (4th) were each issued 30-minute penalties for exceeding the speed-limit while driving during the course of the leg. Their placements were dropped to 4th and 5th place, respectively. Evelyn & Jorge were eligible to be penalized for the same infraction, but they were the last team to arrive to the Pit Stop, resulting in their elimination.
Manfred & Pierre failed to complete an additional task at the Lienzo Charro Ignacio Zermeño. After all the other teams had already checked in at the Pit Stop, Toya came out to their location to inform them of their elimination.
 Leg 12 was a double-length leg. It featured a Virtual Pit Stop and had one Detour (first half) and two Roadblocks shown over two episodes.

Prizes
The prize for each leg is awarded to the first place team for that leg.

Leg 1 – Two Express Passes (Pases Directos) – an item that can be used to skip any one task of the team's choosing. The winning team keeps one for themselves but must relinquish the second to another team before the end of the fourth leg.
Leg 2 – A pair of water resistant watches.
Leg 3 – A pair of wireless speakers.
Leg 4 – A pair of digital music players.
Leg 5 – A pair of water resistant high-definition cameras.
Leg 6 – A pair of digital cameras.
Leg 7 – A pair of mountain bikes.
Leg 8 – US$2,500 for each team member courtesy of Scotiabank.
Leg 9 – A pair of smartphones.
Leg 10 – A pair of LED TVs.
Leg 11 – A pair of digital cameras for extreme sports.
Leg 12: 
Midpoint – A pair of tablet computers.
1st Place – US$250,000
2nd Place – US$20,000
3rd Place – A trip for four to Orlando, Florida, United States.

Race summary

Leg 1 (Colombia)

Airdate: September 16, 2013
Tierra Bomba Island, Cartagena, Colombia (Fort San Fernando de Bocachica) (Starting Line)
 Cartagena (La Bodeguita Dock)
Cartagena (Torre del Reloj)
Cartagena (Plaza Fernández de Madrid)
Cartagena (Hotel Las Américas Casa de Playa – Beach) 
Cartagena (Hotel Las Américas Casa de Playa – Deck of Swimming Pool #3) 

In this season's first Roadblock, one team member had to search among hundreds of sandcastles for one containing a small buried statue of India Catalina and exchange it for their next clue. If they did not find the clue, they had to rebuild the sandcastle before continuing.

Additional tasks
At Fort San Fernando de Bocachica, teams had to search among seven ship models with letters on their sails for six letters that were not repeated. Once teams got all six letters, they had to figure out the correct word (CARIBE) and tell it to Toya Montoya in exchange for their next clue.
After completing the Starting Line task, teams had to travel by motorboat to La Bodeguita Dock, where they had to search for a hat vendor, who would hand them their next clue.
At Torre del Reloj, teams had to load three blocks of ice into a wooden cart and then transport them to Plaza Fernández de Madrid. Once there, they would exchange the blocks of ice for their next clue.

Leg 2 (Colombia)

Airdate: September 23, 2013
Cartagena (Sonesta Beach Resort Cartagena)
Barranquilla (Museo del Caribe ) 
Barranquilla (Complejo Deportivo Carlos "El Pibe" Valderrama) 
Santa Marta (Marina) (Overnight Rest)
Santa Marta (Port of Santa Marta) 
Santa Marta (Quinta de San Pedro Alejandrino) 

In this leg's first Roadblock, one team member had to count all the tubes from a work of art located in front of the museum. Once they had the correct number, they had to find the judge in Gabriel García Márquez room, and tell her the answer, 454, in order to receive their next clue.

In this leg's second Roadblock, the team member who did not perform the previous Roadblock had to use a forklift to move three palettes of sacks to the marked dropping point. Then, they had to look for ten marked containers from behind a marked line and write down the identification numbers on a paper. Then, they had to find the judge and give her the numbers of the marked containers. If correct, she would give them their next clue.

Additional tasks
From Sonesta Beach Resort Cartagena, teams had to travel by taxi to Museo del Caribe to find their next clue.
At the Complejo Deportivo Carlos "El Pibe" Valderrama, teams encountered an Intersection and two teams had to join together, play against four soccer players, and score four goals within 15 minutes. If intersected teams were successful, they would receive their next clue from the referee, otherwise the next pair of teams would use the soccer field.

Leg 3 (Colombia)

Airdate: September 30, 2013
 Santa Marta (Simón Bolívar International Airport) to Bogotá (El Dorado International Airport)
Tocancipá (Jaime Duque Park) 
Zipaquirá (Plaza del Minero) 
Zipaquirá (Salt Cathedral of Zipaquirá)
Zipaquirá (Main Plaza – Zipaquirá Cathedral) 

In this leg's first Roadblock, one team member had to make their way to a frigate located in the Caribbean Sea zone of the park, once there they had to decipher a code on the banners of the frigate using a table with codes and looking from a long distance. If they give the correct answer to the judge, FORTUNA IUVAT AUDACES, they would receive their next clue.

In this leg's second Roadblock, the team member who did not perform the previous Roadblock had to climb up a Ceiba-shaped climbing wall. The team member had to retrieve an Amazing Race flag from the top of the climbing wall and exchange it for the next clue.

Additional tasks
After completing the first Roadblock, teams had to use a Samsung Galaxy S4 and photograph four different characters (Bikers, Girl with balloons, Singer, and Juggler) located all over the park using four different features of the cellphone's camera (Drama, Panoramic, Sound and capture, and Animated picture, respectively). After teams photographed all four characters, they had to exchange the pictures with the judge located at the Tyrannosaurus rex exhibition.
Teams had to search on the grounds of the Salt Cathedral of Zipaquirá for a set of puzzle pieces. Once teams found them, they had to make their way to the outside of the cathedral and complete the puzzle, which would show the next Pit Stop: Zipaquirá Cathedral located in the town's Main Plaza.

Leg 4 (Colombia → Peru)

Airdate: October 7, 2013
 Bogotá (El Dorado International Airport) to Iquitos, Peru (Coronel FAP Francisco Secada Vignetta International Airport)
Iquitos (Centro de Rescate Amazónico) 
Iquitos (Hacienda Acarahuasú) 
Iquitos (Ferretería Loreto Importaciones)
Iquitos (Hotel El Dorado Plaza)
 Iquitos (Mercado de Productores or Casa de Fierro)
 Iquitos (Club Social Deportivo de Caza y Pesca) to Santo Tomás Island
 Iquitos (Mirador Independencia) 

For their Speed Bump, Tobías & Ezequiel had to clean a manatee tank, then clean the two manatee babies and feed them before they could continue racing.

In this leg's Roadblock, one person had to use a simple, traditional tool to climb to the top of a fruit tree and hack off a branch of aguaje fruits to fill a bag and get their next clue.

This season's first Detour was a choice between Entregar (Deliver) or Observar (Observe). In Entregar, teams traveled to Mercado de Productores, where they would picked up three bags of yuca and three bushels of bananas. They had to load them into a moto-taxi and deliver them to three different welfare centers and exchange them for stamps. Once they had all three stamps, they could exchange them for their next clue. In Observar, teams had to look for five consonants (PTMYZ) and three vowels (UAO) written on the tops of moto-taxis. Once they got all eight letters, they would receive a numerical value for each one, and with this they had to solve a mathematical problem, multiplying the value of the consonants and dividing it for the value of the vowels. If they give the correct answer to the judge (157.5), they would get their next clue.

Additional tasks
At Ferretería Loreto Importaciones, teams had to use a provided ScotiaBank credit card to purchase a hammer, nails, rope, and gloves.
On Santo Tomás Island, teams had to build a raft using the tools they had purchased earlier that matched a provided example. If the judge was satisfied with their work, the teams would receive their next clue, which instructed them to paddle on their rafts along the Amazonas River to the next Pit Stop, Mirador Independencia.

Leg 5 (Peru)

Airdate: October 14, 2013
 Iquitos (Coronel FAP Francisco Secada Vignetta International Airport) to Lima (Jorge Chávez International Airport)
Lima (Centro Comercial Textil e Industrial de Gamarra)
Lima (Hotel Casa Andina Select) (Overnight Rest) 
Lima (Primera Brigada de Fuerzas Especiales) 
Callao (Club Universitario de Regatas)
Lima (Le Cordon Bleu Peru) 
Lima (Wak'a Wallamarka) 

For their Speed Bump, Débora & Renata had to deliver twenty suitcases to ten different rooms of the hotel, without using the elevator, before they could continue racing.

This leg's Detour was a choice between Fuerzas Especiales (Special Forces) or Paracaidistas (Paratroopers). In Fuerzas Especiales, teams had to complete a course used by the Peruvian Special Forces to train, which included climbing, to receive their next clue. In Paracaidistas, teams had to complete a training session of the paratroopers division, which included bungee jumping from a tower to the ground, to receive their next clue.

In this leg's Roadblock, one team member had to eat and then recognize four out of six different ingredients in each of four different dishes to receive their next clue from the chef.

Additional tasks
At Centro Comercial Textil e Industrial de Gamarra, teams had to buy yellow and black cloth in order to make an Amazing Race flag. First, they had to take their cloths to Galería Santa Rosa, where a man would sew their cloths together. Then, teams had to take their flag to Galería Victoria, where another man would embroider the words The Amazing Race on it and give them their next clue. Teams had to keep their flags for the rest of the leg.
At Primera Brigada de Fuerzas Especiales, teams had to undergo a military training exercise to receive their next clue.
At the Club Universitario de Regatas, teams had to complete an Olympic rowing circuit to receive their next clue from the rowing instructor.

Leg 6 (Peru → Curaçao)

Airdate: October 21, 2013
 Lima (Jorge Chávez International Airport) to Willemstad, Curaçao, Netherlands (Curaçao International Airport)
Willemstad (Wilhelmina Park)
Willemstad (Queen Juliana Bridge) 
Jan Thiel (Caracasbaaiweg Roundabout) 
 Jan Thiel (Windsurfing School Curaçao)
Willemstad (CBA Television – É Notisia Studio)
Willemstad (Tula Monument)
Cas Abao (Cas Abao Beach) 

In this leg's first Roadblock, one team member had to rappel down the Queen Juliana Bridge and get their next clue from the instructor once on the ground. Then, the team member had to follow a marked path back to the top of the bridge and reunite with their teammate.

In this leg's second Roadblock, the team member who did not perform the previous Roadblock had to stand up paddle to a nearby platform, where they would have to rescue a person and take them back to shore in order to get their next clue.

A Fast Forward clue was visible along with the second Roadblock clue. It is unknown what the task required, since it was unaired.

Additional task
At the É Notisia Studio in CBA Television Studios, teams had to read a news segment written in Papiamentu, which reported a terrible accident at the Tula Monument. If teams completed this task correctly, they would be instructed to make their way on foot to the Tula Monument in Rif in order to assist in a simulation of an accident. Once there, teams had to do perform first aid to an injured person and then take them to an ambulance. Once teams completed their task correctly, the paramedic would hand them their next clue.

Leg 7 (Curaçao → Dominican Republic)

Airdate: October 28, 2013
 Willemstad (Curaçao International Airport) to Santo Domingo, Dominican Republic (Las Américas International Airport)
Santo Domingo (Crowne Plaza Santo Domingo – Club Lounge) (Overnight Rest)
Santo Domingo (Plaza de la Cultura)
 Santo Domingo (Casandra Damirón Metro Station) to Villa Mella (Mamá Tingó Metro Station)
Villa Mella (La Sirena Store)
 Villa Mella (Mamá Tingó Metro Station) to Santo Domingo (Gregorio Luperón Metro Station)
Santo Domingo (Cristo Te Ama School)
 Santo Domingo (Gregorio Urbano Gilbert Metro Station to Juan Bosch Metro Station)
Santo Domingo (Centro Olímpico Juan Pablo Duarte) 
Santo Domingo (Saint Michael's Church)
 Santo Domingo (Mercado Modelo or Chinatown)
Santo Domingo (Fortaleza Ozama) 

In this leg's Roadblock, one team member had to play la vitilla, a game derived from baseball, which required the team member to use a bat, similar to a broomstick, and hit a small ball ten times between the delimited area to receive their next clue from the coach.

This leg's Detour was a choice between Cuadro (Picture) or Cartel (Poster). In Cuadro, teams had to make their way to the Mercado Modelo and search in one of two marked art stores for a picture matching their given extract of the original picture. Once teams found their picture, they had to exchange it for their next clue. In Cartel, teams had to make their way to the Chinatown, where they had to search for a poster matching their given Chinese characters in order to get their next clue.

Additional tasks
At La Sirena Store, teams had to buy four pairs of school shoes and ten items from a school supplies list for a total amount of RD$ 2,792, with only a 0,99 cents of margin of error. If teams bought all ten items using no more or less than the indicated money, they would receive their next clue. This clue instructed teams to make their way by Santo Domingo Metro to the Cristo Te Ama School and deliver the school supplies to the children to receive their next clue.
At Saint Michael's Church, teams would receive their clue from a parishioner sitting next to a table full of candles. Teams had to notice a sign over the table that instructed them to also "light a candle for Saint Michael".

Leg 8 (Dominican Republic)

Airdate: November 4, 2013
Cabarete (Kite Beach Hotel – Private Beach) 
Puerto Plata (VH Gran Ventana Beach Resort) (Overnight Rest)
Puerto Plata (Casa Museo General Gregorio Luperón) 
Imbert (27 Charcos de la Damajagua)
Puerto Plata (Playa Dorada Golf Course) 
Puerto Plata (Puntilla del Malecón) 

In this leg's Roadblock, one team member had to complete an obstacles circuit with their hands tied, crawling over a pool with water, digging on the sand with their feet until they found a figurine, and then digging with their feet to make enough space to go under a tree trunk to receive their next clue.

For their Speed Bump, Evelyn & Jorge had to eat each one plate of mofongo before they could continue racing.

This leg's Detour was a choice between Distancia (Distance) or Precisión (Accuracy). In Precisión, each team member had to hit a golf ball to the hole in no more than two hits. Once each team member sunk five balls in the hole, they would receive their next clue.

Additional task
At the 27 Charcos de la Damajagua, teams had to complete a circuit in which they had to climb small waterfalls and then return sliding down the waterfalls and in some cases jumping off them. Then, teams had to collect two small bags with coins and deposit them on a Scotiabank piggy bank. Once teams completed the course, they would receive their next clue from their guide.

Leg 9 (Dominican Republic → Panama)

Airdate: November 11, 2013
 Santo Domingo (Las Américas International Airport) to Panama City, Panama (Tocumen International Airport)
Panama City (Parque Corporativo Albrook Field – Scotiabank ATM)
 Panama City (Albrook Bus Terminal) to Chame (Bus Stop)
Nueva Gorgona (Hotel Cabañas de Playa Gorgona) (Overnight Rest)
Chame (Nitrocity Panama Action Sports Resort)  
Panama City (Plaza de Francia )
Panama City (Isaac Hanono Misrri Street) 
Panama City (Bayfront Tower – Helipad) 

This leg's Detour was a choice between Tierra (Earth) or Agua (Water). In Tierra, both team members had to ride an all-terrain vehicle on a course while looking for their clue under one of many buckets, with only a few containing clues and the rest containing hourglasses. If teams found an hourglass instead of a clue, they would have to wait until the sand went from one side of the hourglass to the other before continuing their search. In Agua, one team member at a time had to ride a wakeboard while being towed by an electronic mechanism from one side of a lagoon to the other without falling from the board, and then returning in the same way to the starting point. Once both team members had completed this task successfully, they would receive their next clue.

In this leg's Roadblock, one team member had to search among the classified ads of fifty newspapers for the one containing their next clue. This ad instructed teams to make their way to the next Pit Stop, the helipad of the Bayfront Tower.

Additional task
At the Scotiabank ATM, teams had to get their leg money, US$260, from the automated teller machine.

Leg 10 (Panama)

Airdate: November 18, 2013
 Cartí Sugtupu, Kuna Yala (Cartí Dock) to El Porvenir, San Blas Islands (El Porvenir Dock)
El Porvenir (El Porvenir Beach) (Overnight Rest)
Nalunega Island (Néstor's House)
Tortuga Island (Beach)
Perro Island (Perro Island's Dock) 
 Perro Island (Shipwreck)
Pelícano Island (Beach) 

This leg's Detour was a choice between Visual or Manual. In Visual, teams had to search for a Mola matching their given picture among many molas hanging from a cord. Once teams found the correct mola, the Kuna woman would give them their next clue. In Manual, teams had to build the wall of a Kuna hut using only Gynerium sagittatum for its construction. Once the judge was pleased with their work, teams would receive their next clue.

In this leg's Roadblock, one team member had to swim from the beach to a shipwreck, where they had to search for a conch containing their next clue, among dozens of empty conches. Once the team members got the clue, they had to swim back to the beach and read the clue with their teammate.

Additional tasks
At El Porvenir Beach, teams had to sign up for one of four departure times for the next morning, starting at 9:00 a.m. until 9:15 a.m. Then, teams had to assemble the tent in which they would spend the night.
Teams had to search in the Nalunega Island for Néstor's House, where an old woman from the Kuna people would hand them their next clue.
At the beach on Tortuga Island, teams had to place a sail on a cayuco. Once the instructor approved their work, teams had to use this boat to make their way to the Perro Island.

Leg 11 (Panama → Mexico)

Airdate: November 25, 2013
 Panama City (Tocumen International Airport) to Guadalajara, Mexico (Miguel Hidalgo y Costilla International Airport)
Zapopan (Patria Avenue #2051 – Scotiabank ATM)
Guadalajara (Hotel Fiesta Americana) (Overnight Rest)
Tequila (Mundo Cuervo) 
 Tequila (Mundo Cuervo Agave Plantation)
Guadalajara (Tortas Toño) 
Guadalajara (Lienzo Charro Ignacio Zermeño Padilla)
Guadalajara (Plaza de Armas)
Guadalajara (Instituto Cultural Cabañas) 

For their Speed Bump, Darío & Esther had to find the correct card with The Amazing Race logo among dozens of cards with logos that looked similar before they could continue racing.

In this leg's first Roadblock, one team member had to harvest seven agave tequilana plants using the traditional Jimador harvesting method to receive their next clue.

In this leg's second Roadblock, the team member who did not perform the previous Roadblock had to eat four small tortas ahogadas, a sandwich submerged in dried chili pepper, to receive their next clue.

Additional tasks
At the Scotiabank ATM, teams had to get their leg money from the automated teller machine.
At the Lienzo Charro Ignacio Zermeño Padilla, each team member had to perform twenty consecutive figures with a lasso, known as floreo de reata, following the charro demonstration. Once both team members completed the floreo de reata successfully, the charro would hand them their next clue.

Leg 12 (Mexico)

Airdate: December 2, 2013
 Guadalajara (Miguel Hidalgo y Costilla International Airport) to Puerto Vallarta (Licenciado Gustavo Díaz Ordaz International Airport)
Puerto Vallarta (Malecón – La Rotonda del Mar)
 Mismaloya (Encore Bungee & Adventure Park)
Puerto Vallarta (Malecón – El Caballito)
Puerto Vallarta (Galeana Street)
Nuevo Vallarta (Vallarta Adventures) 
 Nuevo Vallarta (Vallarta Adventures Pier) to Puerto Vallarta (Las Caletas Beach)
Puerto Vallarta (Las Caletas Beach – Theatre) 

In this leg's first Roadblock, one team member had to climb a crane located on a cliff over the sea and bungee jump from a platform  over the sea to receive their next clue.

This season's final Detour was a choice between Ascenso de Rana (Frog Ascent) or Escalera Loca (Crazy Ladder). For both Detour options, teams had to drive a four-wheel drive vehicle to their chosen location inside the adventure park. In Ascenso de Rana, one team member at a time had to use an ascender in order to climb a rope and reach a platform high above the ground in less than ten minutes. Once both team members were at the platform, they had to rappel down so they would receive their clue from the hands of the instructor. Then, each team member had to rappel down, and once both reached the ground, they would get their next clue.

Additional tasks
Teams had to find Don Regino near El Caballito on the Malecón, who would give them instructions to build a tower made by equilibrating stones of different shapes and sizes. Once teams had equilibrated the stones correctly to build a tower, Don Regino would hand them their next clue.
At Galeana Street, teams had to dress up with Vallarta Adventure clothing and travel in one of their trucks to their installations.

Airdate: December 9, 2013
 Puerto Vallarta (Licenciado Gustavo Díaz Ordaz International Airport) to Tuxtla Gutiérrez (Ángel Albino Corzo International Airport)
 Tuxtla Gutiérrez (OCC Bus Terminal) to San Cristóbal de las Casas (OCC Bus Terminal)
San Cristóbal de las Casas (Museo del Ámbar) (Overnight Rest)
San Cristóbal de las Casas (San Cristobalito Church stairs)
San Cristóbal de las Casas (Public Market José Castillo Tielemans) 
San Cristóbal de las Casas (Casa de la Enseñanza)
Chiapa de Corzo (Amikúu Park – Marina)
 Chiapa de Corzo (Amikúu Park – Sumidero Canyon)
Chiapa de Corzo (Amikúu Park – Pier)
Chiapa de Corzo (Amikúu Park – Museum)
Chiapa de Corzo (Amikúu Park – Amphitheater) 

In this season's final Roadblock, one team member had to choose a marked cart with twelve fruit crates and deliver them using the cart to twelve marked stalls in the market, in exchange for a stamp. Once the team member had all 12 stamps, they would receive their next clue.

Additional tasks
At the Museo del Ámbar, teams were given a Samsung Galaxy S4 mobile phone and were instructed to take a picture of every location they received a clue using the Dualshot feature (Museo del Ámbar, San Cristobalito Church, Public Market José Castillo Tielemans (both before and after completing the Roadblock) and Casa de la Enseñanza). After taking the picture of the clue giver in Casa de la Enseñanza, he would check all the pictures and if they had all of them, teams would receive their next clue.
At the San Cristobalito Church stairs, teams had to transport four wood log bundles from the bottom of the stairs to the top following the traditional Tzotzil method of carrying them attached to their heads and transporting only one at a time to receive their next clue from a Tzotzil woman.
Teams had to pay with their Scotiabank card in order to enter the Amikúu Park.
Teams had to kayak from the Sumidero Canyon to the pier of the Amikúu Park. Then, teams had to make their way on foot to the museum of the park, where they would find their next clue.
At the Amikúu Park Museum, each team member had to answer two questions correctly that would give them a four number code that would be used to open a safe adding the letter A at the end of the code. The first team member had to answer the following questions: In how many Pit Stops there were more than one local greeter? (6), and Which is the number of the team that arrived 3rd at the 2nd leg Pit Stop? (9; Débora & Renata); While the second team member had to answer the following questions: The number of countries visited (6), minus the number of legs that took place on a Capital City (5), (6–5 = 1), and the number of aquatic transportations used during the season (5). Once teams had the correct code, 6915A, the safe would open and teams would receive their next clue.

References

External links
Official Site 

Latin America 5
2013 television seasons
Television shows filmed in Colombia
Television shows filmed in Peru
Television shows filmed in Curaçao
Television shows filmed in the Dominican Republic
Television shows filmed in Panama
Television shows filmed in Mexico
Reality television articles with incorrect naming style